Winfarthing is a village and civil parish in the English county of Norfolk. It is located 6 km north of the town of Diss, 20 km east of the town of Thetford, and 30 km south of the city of Norwich.

For the purposes of local government, the parish falls within the district of South Norfolk.

The village is a prime example of a linear village, being strung out along the B1077 road between Diss and Attleborough for around 2 km/1.25m.  It is home to the Fighting Cocks public house, All Saints Church of England Primary School and St Mary's church.  Until the early 1990s it had a small Royal Mail Post Office and shop.  There is still a red post box at the site of the old Post Office with regular collections.  Farming is the primary local business, with several dairy, arable and pig farms in the surrounding area.

Henry VIII is known to have visited the area. There was a large oak tree in the village at that time that was standing until the late 20th century.

History
The place-name 'Winfarthing' is first attested in the Domesday Book of 1086, where it appears as Wineferthinc. The name means "Wina's quarter part". The name of the former English coin the farthing has a similar origin, meaning "the fourth part (of a penny)".

The parish of Winfarthing was a demesne of the King until c. 1189 in the reign of Henry II, when it was sold off to a private land owner. In 1600, there were 189 communicants, and by 1739, there were 50 dwelling-houses, and about 260 inhabitants in total, at which point the parish was valued for tax purposes at £924 (£ today).

References

 Winfarthing parish data, South Norfolk Council. Retrieved 20 June 2009.

External links

Diss Express - village's local newspaper website
.
Information from Genuki Norfolk on Winfarthing.

Villages in Norfolk
Civil parishes in Norfolk